Sir Tom Stoppard is an English playwright known for his works on stage and screen.

He has received various awards including an Academy Award, a British Academy Film Award, and Golden Globe Award for his screenplay for Shakespeare in Love (1998). He has also received four Tony Awards for Best Play for Rosencrantz and Guildenstern Are Dead (1968), Travesties (1976), The Real Thing (1984), and The Coast of Utopia (2007). He has also received three Laurence Olivier Awards for Arcadia (1994), Heroes (2006), and Leopoldstadt (2020). He also received a Primetime Emmy Award nomination for Parade's End (2013).

Major associations

Academy Awards

BAFTA Awards

Golden Globe Awards

Primetime Emmy Award

Tony Awards

Olivier Awards

Industry awards

Evening Standard Award 
 1967: Most Promising Playwright (UK)
 1972: Jumpers for Best Play, Plays and Players London Theatre Critics Award for Best New Play (UK)
 1974: Travesties – Evening Standard Award for Best Comedy of the Year (UK)
 1978: Night and Day – Evening Standard Award for Best Play (UK)
 1982: The Real Thing – Evening Standard Award for Best Play (UK)
 1993: Arcadia [[Evening Standard Theatre Awards|Evening Standard Award]] for Best Play of the Year
 1997: The Invention of Love – Evening Standard Award for Best Play (UK)

London Theatre Critics Award 
 1967: Plays and Players London Theatre Critics Award for Rosencrantz and Guildenstern Are Dead (UK)
 1968: Plays and Players London Theatre Critics Award for Best New Play (UK) for Rosencrantz and Guildenstern Are Dead
 1972: Plays and Players London Theatre Critics Award for Best New Play (UK) for Jumpers

Prix Italia 
 1968: Albert's Bridge – (Italy)

Giles Cooper Award 
 1982: The Dog It Was That Died 
 1991: In the Native State

Silver Bear  
 1999: Shakespeare in Love – Silver Bear for an outstanding single achievement (Berlin)

Drama Desk Award  
 2000: The Real Thing – Drama Desk Award for Outstanding Revival of a Play (US)

New York Critics Circle  
 2001: The Invention of Love – New York Drama Critics Circle Award for Best Play (US)

Honorary awards

Special Honours

 1972: Elected as a Fellow of the Royal Society of Literature
 1978: Commander of the Order of the British Empire in the 1978 New Year Honours
 1997: Knight Bachelor in the 1997 Birthday Honours for services to literature
 1999: Induction into American Theater Hall of Fame
 2000: Order of Merit
 2000: Honorary Doctor of Letters, Yale University
 2000: Honorary Doctor of Letters, University of Cambridge
 2002: President of The London Library
 2009: Honorary Patronage of the University Philosophical Society, Trinity College Dublin
 2013: Honorary Doctor of Letters, University of Oxford
 2017: Honorary Fellow of the British Academy

Special prizes   
 2007: The Critics' Circle Award for Distinguished Service to the Arts (presented on 3 April 2008 at the National Theatre) (UK)
 2008: The 2008 Dan David Prize for Creative Rendering of the Past in Theatre (Israeli)
 2013: The PEN Pinter Prize for "determination to tell things as they are." (UK)
 2013: Laurel Award for Screenwriting Achievement
 2015: PEN/Allen Foundation Literary Service Award
 2017: America Award in Literature
 2017: David Cohen Prize

References 

Stoppard, Tom
Stoppard family